Atmospheric noise is radio noise caused by natural atmospheric processes, primarily lightning discharges in thunderstorms. On a worldwide scale, there are about 40 lightning flashes per second – ≈3.5 million lightning discharges per day.


History

In 1925, AT&T Bell Laboratories started investigating the sources of noise in its transatlantic radio telephone service.

Karl Jansky, a 22-year-old researcher, undertook the task. By 1930, a radio antenna for a wavelength of 14.6 meters was constructed in Holmdel, NJ, to measure the noise in all directions. Jansky recognized three sources of radio noise. The first (and strongest) source was local thunderstorms. The second source was weaker noise from more distant thunderstorms. The third source was a still weaker hiss that turned out to be galactic noise from the center of the Milky Way. Jansky's research made him the father of radio astronomy.

In early 1950s, a mathematical model of the impact of lightning and thunderstorms on broadcasting was published by S. V. C. Aiya

Lightning

Atmospheric noise is radio noise caused by natural atmospheric processes, primarily lightning discharges in thunderstorms. It is mainly caused by cloud-to-ground flashes as the current is much stronger than that of cloud-to-cloud flashes. On a worldwide scale, 3.5 million lightning flashes occur daily. That means there are about 40 lightning flashes per second.

The sum of all these lightning flashes results in atmospheric noise. It can be observed, with a radio receiver, in the form of a combination of white noise (coming from distant thunderstorms) and impulse noise (coming from a near thunderstorm). The power-sum varies with seasons and nearness of thunderstorm centers.

Although lightning has a broad-spectrum emission, its noise power increases with decreasing frequency. Therefore, at very low frequency and low frequency, atmospheric noise often dominates, while at high frequency, man-made noise dominates in urban areas.

Survey
From 1960s to 1980s, a worldwide effort was made to measure the atmospheric noise and variations.  Results have been documented in CCIR Report 322.  CCIR 322 provided seasonal world maps showing the expected values of the atmospheric noise figure Fa at 1 MHz during four hour blocks of the day.  Another set of charts relates the Fa at 1 MHz to other frequencies.  CCIR Report 322 has been superseded by ITU P.372 publication.

Random number generation
Atmospheric noise and variation is also used to generate high quality random numbers. Random numbers have crucial applications in the security domain.

See also 
 Radio atmospheric

Footnotes

References

Noise (electronics)